Howell Hollow is a valley in northwest Shannon County in the U.S. state of Missouri. The northeast flowing intermittent stream in the valley is a tributary to the Current River about one mile northwest of Akers.

Howell Hollow has the name of the local Howell family.

References

Valleys of Shannon County, Missouri
Valleys of Missouri